Bou Hajla is a town and commune in the Kairouan Governorate, Tunisia.  it had a population of 6,002.

With an initial investment of 5,200,000 Tunisian dinars, this permit is a partnership between Tunisia DualEx Inc. and the Tunisian Company of Petroleum Activities for the production of oil and gas from the site.

The town lacks previous industrial developments and has a higher-than-average unemployment rate.

See also

List of cities in Tunisia
Oil reserves in Libya

References

Populated places in Kairouan Governorate
Communes of Tunisia
Tunisia geography articles needing translation from French Wikipedia